Sir Cecil Ernest Moon, 2nd Baronet (2 September 1867 – 22 February 1951) was an English first-class cricketer. 

The son of Edward Moon, he was born at Watford in September 1867. He was educated at Uppingham School, before going up to the University of Giessen in Germany. Moon succeeded his grandfather as the 2nd Baronet of the Moon baronets upon his death in November 1899; the Baronetage had been created for his grandfather, Sir Richard Moon, in 1887. He played first-class cricket in 1900 for London County, under the captaincy of W. G. Grace, making a single appearance against Derbyshire at Derby. Batting twice in the match, he was dismissed for 17 runs in the London County first innings by Harry Bagshaw, while in their second innings he was dismissed for 12 runs by John Hulme. He shortly after emigrated to the United States, where he married an Irish immigrant named Kate Lawder, with the couple running a ranch near Fort Collins, Colorado. They divorced in 1909, with him later returning to England. Moon died, without issue, at Buxton in February 1951. He was succeeded as the 3rd Baronet by his nephew Sir Richard Moon. His uncle, Benjamin Darbyshire, was also a first-class cricketer.

References

External links

1867 births
1951 deaths
People from Watford
People educated at Uppingham School
University of Giessen alumni
Baronets in the Baronetage of the United Kingdom
English cricketers
London County cricketers
English emigrants to the United States
Ranchers